The 1989 Women's Lacrosse World Cup was the third Women's Lacrosse World Cup and was played in Perth, Australia from 2–9 September 1989. The United States defeated England in the final to win the tournament.

Results

Table

Fifth Place Play Off (September 9)
Scotland v Wales 5-3

Third Place Play Off (September 9)
Australia v Canada 10-1

Final (September 9)
United States v England 7-6

References

2009 Women's
1989 in lacrosse
Lacrosse World Cup
Women's lacrosse in Australia
1989 in Australian women's sport